Dominica participated at the 2018 Summer Youth Olympics in Buenos Aires, Argentina from 6 October to 18 October 2018.

Competitors
The following is the list of number of competitors participating at the Games per sport/discipline.

Athletics

Beach volleyball

Dominica qualified a girls' team based on their performance at the 2018 EVCA Zone U19 Championship.

 Girls' tournament - 1 team of 2 athletes

See also
Dominica at the 2018 Commonwealth Games

References

Nations at the 2018 Summer Youth Olympics
Dominica at the Youth Olympics
2018 in Dominica sport